During the 2006–07 English football season, Aston Villa F.C. competed in the FA Premier League. It was Villa's first season under the management of Northern Irishman Martin O'Neill, who was appointed as manager following the sacking of David O'Leary at the end of the previous season.

Villa started life under Martin O'Neill strongly and were the last team in the Premier League to be beaten, going nine matches without defeat and taking points against the likes of Arsenal and Chelsea away before a 3–1 loss at Liverpool. A run of 11 games without victory during the middle of the season dragged Villa down to 14th place, putting paid to their early-season hopes of Champions League qualification, but Villa rallied and only lost 3 of their last 15 games to finish comfortably in 11th.

Final league table

Results

Pre-season

Premier League

Results by matchday

FA Cup

League Cup

Players

First-team squad
Squad at end of season

Left club during season

Reserve squad
The following players spent most of the season playing for the reserve team, and did not appear for the first team.

Youth squad
The following players spent most of the season playing for the youth team, and did not appear for the first team, but may have appeared for the reserve team.

Other players

Squad statistics

Transfers
The season saw Villa break its transfer record when they signed Ashley Young for £8 million from Watford, heralding a new era and a strategy of signing young players with experience from the British game. The signing of Bulgarian international Stiliyan Petrov was another important manoeuvre from Martin O'Neill, who was given larger resource in comparison to his predecessors by new American owner Randy Lerner.

In

Out

Loans in

Loans out

References

Notes

External links
Aston Villa official website
avfchistory.co.uk 2006–07 season

Aston Villa F.C. seasons
Aston Villa F.C.